In mathematics, a sporadic group is one of the 26 exceptional groups found in the classification of finite simple groups.

A simple group is a group G that does not have any normal subgroups except for the trivial group and G itself. The classification theorem states that the list of finite simple groups consists of 18 countably infinite families plus 26 exceptions that do not follow such a systematic pattern. These 26 exceptions are the sporadic groups. They are also known as the sporadic simple groups, or the sporadic finite groups. Because it is not strictly a group of Lie type, the Tits group is sometimes regarded as a sporadic group, in which case there would be 27 sporadic groups.

The monster group is the largest of the sporadic groups, and all but six of the other sporadic groups are subquotients of it.

Names
Five of the sporadic groups were discovered by Mathieu in the 1860s and the other 21 were found between 1965 and 1975. Several of these groups were predicted to exist before they were constructed. Most of the groups are named after the mathematician(s) who first predicted their existence. The full list is:

 Mathieu groups M11 (M11), M12 (M12), M22 (M22), M23 (M23), M24 (M24)
 Janko groups J1 (J1), J2 or HJ (J2), J3 or HJM (J3), J4 (J4)
 Conway groups Co1 (Co1), Co2, Co3 (Co3)
 Fischer groups Fi22 (Fi22), Fi23 (Fi23), Fi24′ or F3+ (Fi24)
 Higman–Sims group HS
 McLaughlin group McL
 Held group He or F7+ or F7
 Rudvalis group Ru
 Suzuki group Suz or F3−
 O'Nan group O'N (ON)
 Harada–Norton group HN or F5+ or F5
 Lyons group Ly
 Thompson group Th or F3|3 or F3
 Baby Monster group B or F2+ or F2
 Fischer–Griess Monster group M or F1

The Tits group T is sometimes also regarded as a sporadic group (it is almost but not strictly a group of Lie type), which is why in some sources the number of sporadic groups is given as 27 instead of 26. In some other sources, the Tits group is regarded as neither sporadic nor of Lie type. For  these finite simple groups coincide with the groups of Lie type  also known as Ree groups of type 2F4.

Matrix representations over finite fields for all the sporadic groups have been constructed. Character tables for sporadic groups and closely related groups are listed in  alongside orders of their outer automorphisms and Schur multipliers, as well lists of maximal subgroups and various constructions. Individual conjugacy classes for each sporadic group are listed in 's ATLAS of Finite Group Representations. The degrees of minimal faithful representation or Brauer characters over fields of characteristic p ≥ 0 have also been calculated for all sporadic groups, and for some of their covering groups.

The earliest use of the term sporadic group may be  where he comments about the Mathieu groups: "These apparently sporadic simple groups would probably repay a closer examination than they have yet received."

It does not show the numerous non-sporadic simple subquotients of the sporadic groups.

Organization

Happy Family

Of the 26 sporadic groups, 20 can be seen inside the monster group as subgroups or quotients of subgroups (sections).
These twenty have been called the happy family by Robert Griess, and can be organized into three generations.

First generation (5 groups): the Mathieu groups

Mn for n = 11, 12, 22, 23 and 24 are multiply transitive permutation groups on n points. They are all subgroups of M24, which is a permutation group on 24 points.

Second generation (7 groups): the Leech lattice

All the subquotients of the automorphism group of a lattice in 24 dimensions called the Leech lattice:

 Co1 is the quotient of the automorphism group by its center {±1}
 Co2 is the stabilizer of a type 2 (i.e., length 2) vector
 Co3 is the stabilizer of a type 3 (i.e., length ) vector
 Suz is the group of automorphisms preserving a complex structure (modulo its center)
 McL is the stabilizer of a type 2-2-3 triangle
 HS is the stabilizer of a type 2-3-3 triangle
 J2 is the group of automorphisms preserving a quaternionic structure (modulo its center).

Third generation (8 groups): other subgroups of the Monster

Consists of subgroups which are closely related to the Monster group M:

 B or F2 has a double cover which is the centralizer of an element of order 2 in M
 Fi24′ has a triple cover which is the centralizer of an element of order 3 in M (in conjugacy class "3A")
 Fi23 is a subgroup of Fi24′
 Fi22  has a double cover which is a subgroup of Fi23
 The product of Th = F3 and a group of order 3 is the centralizer of an element of order 3 in M (in conjugacy class "3C")
 The product of HN = F5  and a group of order 5 is the centralizer of an element of order 5 in M
 The product of He = F7 and a group of order 7 is the centralizer of an element of order 7 in M.
 Finally, the Monster group itself is considered to be in this generation.

(This series continues further: the product of M12 and a group of order 11 is the centralizer of an element of order 11 in M.)

The Tits group, if regarded as a sporadic group, would belong in this generation: there is a subgroup S4 ×2F4(2)′ normalising a 2C2 subgroup of B, giving rise to a subgroup 2·S4 ×2F4(2)′ normalising a certain Q8 subgroup of the Monster. 2F4(2)′ is also a subquotient of the Fischer group Fi22, and thus also of Fi23 and Fi24′, and of the Baby Monster B. 2F4(2)′ is also a subquotient of the (pariah) Rudvalis group Ru, and has no involvements in sporadic simple groups except the ones already mentioned.

Pariahs

The six exceptions are J1, J3, J4, O'N, Ru and Ly, sometimes known as the pariahs.

Table of the sporadic group orders (w/ Tits group)

Notes

References

Works Cited 

 

 

 

 

 

  (German)

External links
 
 Atlas of Finite Group Representations: Sporadic groups

Mathematical tables

he:משפט המיון לחבורות פשוטות סופיות